Pfeiffer is an unincorporated community in Hardin County, in the U.S. state of Ohio.

History
Pfeiffer had its start in 1883 when the railroad was extended to that point. John Pfeiffer, an early postmaster, gave the community his last name. A post office was established at Pfeiffer in 1883, and remained in operation until 1906.

References

Unincorporated communities in Hardin County, Ohio
1883 establishments in Ohio
Populated places established in 1883
Unincorporated communities in Ohio